INSEP, the National Institute of Sport, Expertise, and Performance (Institut national du sport, de l'expertise et de la performance), is a French training institute and center for excellence in sports that trains elite athletes. It is located on the outskirts of Paris, in the Bois de Vincennes.

History, activities, and structure
It was formed in 1975 from the merger of INS (the National Institute of Sport) and ENSEP (L'École Normale Supérieure d'Éducation Physique), and has roots in the 1817 Amoros Military Gymnasium. It trains athletes in 26 different sports.

It operates under the French Ministry of Youth and Sport, and functions based on centralized athletic partnerships with prominent high schools in Paris — such as Lycée Condorcet, Lycée Saint-Louis, Lycée Janson de Sailly, GHS Claude Monet, and The International School of Paris — with a measure of autonomy.

Notable alumni

 Nicolas Beaudan, Fencing
 Evan Fournier, Basketball
 Yannick Borel, Fencing
 Frédéric Bourdillon, Basketball
 Clint Capela, Basketball
 Boris Dallo, Basketball
 Stéphane Diagana, Track & Field
 Boris Diaw, Basketball
 Tony Estanguet, Whitewater Slalom
 Romain Gazave (born 1976), Ice Skating
 Anne-Caroline Graffe, Taekwondo
 Sandrine Gruda, Basketball
 Damien Inglis, Basketball
 Daniel Jérent, Fencing
 Joffrey Lauvergne, Basketball
 Émilie Le Pennec, Artistic Gymnastics
 Lila Meesseman-Bakir, Synchronized Swimming
 Mahiedine Mekhissi-Benabbad, Middle distance Running
 Tony Parker, Basketball
 Marie-José Pérec, Track & Field
 Johan Petro, Basketball
 Yves Pons, Basketball
 Lucas Pouille, Tennis
 Teddy Riner, Judo
 Ronny Turiaf, Basketball
 Cyrian Ravet, Taekwondo

Notable faculty
Alphonse Halimi, boxer

See also
Institut de recherche biomédicale et d'épidémiologie du sport
Sport in France
Sports Studies in France

References

External links

National Institutes of Sport
Educational institutions established in 1975
1975 establishments in France
Universities and colleges in Paris
Sport schools in France
Sports academies